Cole Walliser is a Canadian filmmaker and music video director. He has directed videos for Miley Cyrus, P!nk and Katy Perry.

Life and career
Cole Walliser was born in Steveston, British Columbia and grew up in Vancouver. He is an alumnus from the University of British Columbia, with a B.A. in Psychology.

Walliser began his interest in filming by making skateboarding videos at the age of 14. He also made a short film about the first day of high school which is still used by Hugh McRoberts High School, where he attended. He decided to pursue directing as a career and moved to Los Angeles at the age of 24. His work began with shooting professional dancer friends on a pro-bono basis.

In 2008, one of Walliser's dancer friends, who was a choreographer for Miley Cyrus at the time, asked him to be involved in a dance music video, which led him to direct two dance crew episodes of the web series The Miley and Mandy Show ("M&M Cru with a U BATTLES Step Up 2" and "M&M Cru Final Dance Battle: Cyrus Blaine Seacrest Tatum"), challenging Jon Chu's and Adam Sevani's ACDC (aka Adam/Chu Dance Crew). These highly publicized music videos, touted as "the biggest online dance battle in YouTube history" featured a number of celebrity cameos and received worldwide media attention, including a feature on The Ellen DeGeneres Show. The online dance battle culminated in a performance at the 2008 Teen Choice Awards, which Walliser also directed.

In 2009, Cole directed the opening video for P!nk's Funhouse Tour. He also directed a 30-minute documentary Life On Tour with P!nk, and four of her music videos ("Please Don't Leave Me", "Funhouse", "Leave Me Alone (I'm Lonely)" and "Mean"), which played during the Funhouse Summer Carnival Tour.

In 2010, Cole Walliser edited two episodes of the dance webseries, The Legion of Extraordinary Dancers ("Fanboyz" and "The Tale of Trevor Drift"). Subsequently, Walliser collaborated with Katy Perry and directed the storyline that played throughout her California Dreams Tour. He was also entrusted to edit together footage of Perry's wedding to Russell Brand for her intimate performance at the 53rd Grammy Awards in 2011. Walliser also frequently collaborates with Mercedes-Benz and Lexus for their marketing initiatives.

Walliser is also known for high-speed videos of celebrities posing on red carpets, captured by his "GlamBOT", which he posts on his social media accounts along with behind-the-scenes of the setups.

Filmography

Director

Editor

Short films

References

External links
Cole Walliser's Official Website

1981 births
Canadian music video directors
American people of Chinese descent
Living people
People from Richmond, British Columbia
University of British Columbia alumni